Athletes from the Federated States of Micronesia have competed in the Summer Olympic Games five times, but have yet to win any medals.

Medal tables

Medals by Summer Games

See also
 List of flag bearers for the Federated States of Micronesia at the Olympics
 List of participating nations at the Summer Olympic Games
 List of participating nations at the Winter Olympic Games

External links